Jonas Umbach (c. 1624–1693) was a  German painter, designer, and engraver. Born in Augsburg, he became cabinet painter to the Bishop of Augsburg, and produced many landscapes with cattle; also kitchen pieces, feathered game, and a few historical subjects in chiaroscuro. He also etched 230 plates of biblical, historical, and mythological scenes and landscapes. Among these there are:

Christ on the Mount of Olives
Trains of Children and Nereids
Two Duck-shooters lying in Wait
Landscapes with Ruins
Bacchanals and Infant Sports

He died in Augsburg in 1693.

There was a younger Jonas Umbach, but there are no particulars respecting him, except that he drew portraits.

References

Biography at Answers.com
Attribution:

17th-century German painters
German male painters
German designers
Engravers from Augsburg
1620s births
1693 deaths